The 2019–20 III liga was the 12th season of the fourth tier domestic division in the Polish football league system since its establishment in 2008 under its current title (III liga) and the 4th season under its current league division format.

The competition was contested by 72 clubs split geographically across 4 groups of 18 teams each, with the winners of each group gaining promotion to the II liga. The season was played in a round-robin tournament. It began in August 2019 and was supposed to end in June 2020. The teams included amateur clubs (although a few are semi-professional) and the reserve teams of professional clubs.

72 teams are divided into four groups according to geographical criteria:
 Group 1 (Łódź – Masovian – Podlaskie – Warmian-Masurian)
 Group 2 (Kuyavian-Pomeranian – Greater Poland – Pomeranian – West Pomeranian)
 Group 3 (Lower Silesian – Lubusz – Opole – Silesian)
 Group 4 (Świętokrzyskie – Lesser Poland – Lublin – Podkarpackie)

Each group of III liga is managed by a different voivodeship football association. In the 2019–20 season these are the following regionals federations:
 Group 1 – Warmian-Masurian Football Association
 Group 2 – Greater Poland Football Association
 Group 3 – Silesian Football Association
 Group 4 – Lublin Football Association

The season was suspended indefinitely on 12 March 2020 due to the COVID-19 pandemic. On May 14–18, 2020, the regionals federations announced the termination of the competition. The leaders of each group (except Group 4) have been promoted to the II liga. No team has been relegated to the IV liga.

Group 1

Group 2

Group 3

Group 4

See also
 2019–20 Ekstraklasa
 2019–20 I liga
 2019–20 II liga
 2019–20 Polish Cup

Notes

References

External link
 Official website 

2019–20
2019–20 in Polish football
Poland
III liga